Coachella may refer to:

 Coachella, California
 Coachella Canal, in California
 Coachella (festival), an annual music and arts festival in California
 "Coachella – Woodstock in My Mind",  a 2017 song by Lana del Rey

See also 
 Coachella Valley (disambiguation)